Mohammad Naeem Wardak (ډاکټر محمد نعیم وردک) (born 1985) is the head of the Afghan Embassy in Qatar since 2021 and a spokesman of the Taliban's Political Office since 2020. He also previously served the same office from 2013 to 2015.

Early life and education
Wardak belongs to Chak District of Wardak Province. He received his early education at a local madrassa in the village of Chak, then enrolled at Nangarhar University in Jalalabad and obtained a BA degree. He then enrolled at the International Islamic University, Islamabad for his master's degree and later did his Ph.D. in Arabic. He also studied for a short time at Darul Uloom Haqqania, Akora Khattak, from where he studied Hadith and Fiqh. Wardak is the first Taliban leader to hold a PhD.

Career
When the Taliban's first political office opened in Qatar in 2013, he was appointed spokesperson. Wardak and Suhail Shaheen both acted as spokespersons at the same time and served until 2015. In 2018 he was made part of the Qatar office again and has been based there ever since. In September 2020, he was re-appointed spokesman for the Taliban's political office in Doha.

After the Taliban took control of Afghanistan, Wardak was nominated to serve as Ambassador to Qatar in October 2021. He was allowed to take over the embassy as First Secretary, but has not received diplomatic accreditation from Qatar.

See also
 Suhail Shaheen

References

External links
 

Living people
1985 births
Taliban leaders
Taliban spokespersons
International Islamic University, Islamabad alumni
People from Maidan Wardak Province
Nangarhar University alumni
Darul Uloom Haqqania alumni
Ambassadors of Afghanistan